The Audaz class was a class of nine destroyers built for the Spanish Navy after the Second World War. Construction was slow, with only four completed to the original design from 1953–1956. The remaining five ships completed as anti-submarine escorts with a new armament and sensor fit from 1960 to 1965, while the original four ships were also modified to this standard. Built at Ferrol, they completed in 1946–1950 and were rated as gunboats, and were redesignated as frigates in 1959. The last of the class, Intrepido, was stricken in 1982.

Construction and design
In 1945, the Spanish State began work on a class of nine small destroyers or torpedo boats, based on the French  design. Seven Le Fier-class ships were laid down in 1939–1940 before the French surrender in 1940 stopped construction. Germany restarted construction of six of the ships, with different armament, but none were completed. The Spanish ships used the same armament layout as intended by the Germans.

Displacement was  standard and  full load. They had a unit machinery layout, with boiler and engine rooms alternating.

As originally designed, they were armed with three  dual-purpose guns, all mounted aft, with four  anti-aircraft guns (one of which was mounted forward of the ship's bridge) and eight  anti-aircraft guns. Six  torpedo tubes in two triple mounts were fitted. The ships had a complement of 145 men.

From 1959, the availability of US military aid resulted in the five ships that were still being built to be completed to a revised design as anti-submarine escorts, with a completely new armament and sensor outfit, while the four ships which had been delivered were refitted to the new standard. Anti-aircraft armament consisted of two US  Mark 34 guns mounted aft and two  Bofors L/70 guns, with one forward of the bridge and one aft of the ship's funnels. Two Hedgehog anti-submarine mortars were fitted, together with eight depth-charge throwers and two depth charge racks, and two launchers for  Mark 32 anti-submarine torpedoes. The modified ships were fitted with MLA-1B air-search radar, SPS-5B surface search radar and SPG-34 fire control radar, with QHBa sonar.

Displacement increased to  standard and  full load while speed dropped to  The revised ship's complement was recorded as 191 in 1971 and 199 in 1979.

Service
Although all nine ships were laid down at the Sociedad Española de Construcción Naval (SECN) shipyard at Ferrol dockyard in 1945, financial problems slowed construction, and the first ship, was not completed until 1953. Three more were completed by 1956, with the remaining five ships completing to the revised arrangement from 1960 to 1965, while the original four ships were modernised by the end of 1963.

One ship, was wrecked in 1966 when it ran aground, while the remaining ships started to be discarded in 1972, with the last ship, stricken in 1982.

Ships
At first, the ships of the class were designated as conventional destroyers, but they were redesignated as fast frigates in 1955, as anti-submarine frigates in 1956 and as anti-submarine destroyers in 1961.

Notes

Citations

References

Destroyers of the Spanish Navy
Destroyer classes
Audaz-class destroyers